Vinod Lakhamashi Chavda is a politician from Kachchh Gujarat who belongs to the Bhartiya Janata Party (BJP).

He contested the 2014 Lok Sabha elections from the Kachchh seat as the BJP and NDA candidate.

He won by getting 562,855 votes against Dr Dinesh Parmar of the Indian National Congress, who got 308,373 votes.

He was a candidate for BJP and NDA for the Kachchh seat in 2019 assembly election. He again won against Mr. Naresh Maheshwari from congress.

References

India MPs 2014–2019
Living people
Lok Sabha members from Gujarat
1979 births
Bharatiya Janata Party politicians from Gujarat
India MPs 2019–present
Politicians from Kutch district